Elephant Island is an uninhabited island in Sanma Province of Vanuatu in the Pacific Ocean.

Geography
It is located in Turtle Bay off the east coast of Espiritu Santo Island.

References

Islands of Vanuatu
Sanma Province
Uninhabited islands of Vanuatu